Legends of Chamberlain Heights is an American adult animated sitcom created by Brad Ableson, Mike Clements, Quinn Hawking, Josiah Johnson, and Michael Starrbury. The series aired on Comedy Central from September 14, 2016 to August 20, 2017.
On October 7, 2017, the series was canceled after two seasons.

Premise
The series focuses on three teenagers Jamal, Milk, and Grover. They're benchwarmers on the high school basketball team, but legends in their own minds.

Cast
Josiah Johnson as Grover Cummings, Milk and Shea Butta
Quinn Hawking as Jamal, Shamal and Rodrigo
Michael Starrbury as Malik Cummings
Jay Pharoah as Montrel Cummings and Randy
MC Eiht
Carl Jones as Coach Bundy
Tiffany Haddish as Cindy
Poochie Jackson as Medina
Erykah Badu provides Medina's singing voice

Series overview

Episodes

Season 1 (2016)

Season 2 (2017)

Controversy
"End of Days" depicts NBA star Kobe Bryant crawling out of a crashed helicopter before it explodes. After the real Bryant was killed in a helicopter crash in January 2020, the episode was removed from the Comedy Central website, and the creators of the show asked people to refrain from sharing the clip on social media out of respect for Bryant.

References

External links
 
 

2016 American television series debuts
2017 American television series endings
2010s American adult animated television series
2010s American animated comedy television series
2010s American black cartoons
2010s American black sitcoms
2010s American high school television series
2010s American teen sitcoms
American adult animated comedy television series
American adult animated sports television series
American animated sitcoms
English-language television shows
Comedy Central animated television series
Animation controversies in television
Television controversies in the United States
Basketball television series
Teen animated television series
Television shows set in Los Angeles